The Outer Perimeter is a freeway originally planned to encircle Atlanta, in the U.S. state of Georgia about  outside of Interstate 285, which is colloquially referred to as the Perimeter and is a point of reference for local travel outside Atlanta's city core.

Planning
The original plan of the highway was to have roughly gone through or near the communities of Cartersville, Canton, Cumming, Buford, Dacula, Loganville, Conyers, McDonough, Hampton, Newnan, Peachtree City, Villa Rica, and Dallas. The roadway was to have roughly paralleled State Route 20, which goes around three sides of Atlanta.

A later incarnation of the highway only encompassed what was termed the Northern Arc and included the portion of the original planned highway from Interstate 75 near Cartersville across to Interstate 85 near the Mall of Georgia in Buford. One proposal tied to this version would have reportedly limited exits to five major interchanges, at the freeways that crossed it: I-75; I-575; US 19/Georgia State Route 400; Interstate 985; and I-85.

The Northern Arc was to have been a toll road under another proposal, which advocates say would have kept most local traffic away from the highway, while freeing it for trucks. Opponents said that despite the toll, the road would have encouraged additional development and congestion, creating the continued urban sprawl that, at times, threatens to overwhelm areas much closer to Atlanta-proper.

Route designation
The highway has been officially designated Georgia State Route 500. Advocates of the highway touted its use by long-distance truck drivers to have them completely avoid the congestion of the highways much closer to Atlanta.

The original Perimeter, I-285, which was originally planned as a bypass of the city and was completed in 1969, has in effect become one of the main freeway routes for both local traffic and traffic passing through the Atlanta area.

Later status
Budgetary constraints, political pressure, and public opposition supposedly killed plans for both incarnations of the road. However, the Northern Arc resurfaced in February 2007, with suggestions that it be placed further north, out of the current path of exurban land development. 

In 2015, SR 20 started to get widened, starting with a new bridge over the Chattahoochee River, to alleviate traffic congestion. The route will closely resemble the original Northern Arc path and the plan will essentially be the Northern Arc replacement.

Update
Quietly in October 2017, the northeasternmost side of the Northern Arc is finally scheduled to be in place. However as of 2021 there have been no updates and the date of construction remains unknown.

Planned to be a toll road from I-85 to SR 316, labeled as the Sugarloaf Parkway Extension, Phase II, one can clearly see the routing. It follows, at least in Gwinnett County, the start of a portion of the outer Atlanta freeway loop. Reading through the information, where the last phase ends at Peachtree Industrial Boulevard, it shows a partial (unfinished) interchange which indicates one day, in the future, the route could continue westward.

See also

Atlanta freeway revolts
Transportation in Atlanta

References

External links
 Atlanta Business Chronicle article
 ABC article, March 2007

Roads in Georgia (U.S. state)
Cancelled highway projects in the United States